The Ponte Buriano is a 1277 stone seven-arch bridge that is located north of the town of Arezzo in the Tuscany region of central Italy. Some references tells that the bridge was used by Leonardo da Vinci in the lower-right quadrant of his painting Mona Lisa.

References

Buriano, Ponte Buriano
Ponte Buriano
Buriano, Ponte Buriano
Buriano, Ponte Buriano
Buriano, Ponte Buriano
Transport in Tuscany
Bridges completed in the 13th century